Kopranik is a mountain with a height of 2,460m in Kosovo. Kopranik is part of the Albanian Alps. At the northern slopes of the mountain is the Rugovska gorge which is a popular tourist destination in the Prokletije and all of Kosovo.

Notes and references
Notes:

References:

Mountains of Kosovo
Accursed Mountains
Two-thousanders of Kosovo